There and Back - Live is an album by the Canadian rock band Chilliwack released in June 2003.

Track listing
 "Fly At Night" (Henderson, Turney) (5:03)
 "Lonesome Mary" (Henderson) (5:14)
 "I Believe" (Henderson) (5:25)
 "Crazy Talk" (Henderson) (6:09)
 "Communication Breakdown" (Henderson) (4:15)
 "Trial By Fire" (Henderson, MacLeod, Roles) (3:35)
 "Groundhog" (Traditional; arranged by Henderson and Turney) (4:48)
 "Whatcha Gonna Do" (Henderson, MacLeod) (4:06)
 "Arms of Mary" (Sutherland) (3:15)
 "Baby Blue" (Henderson, Turney) (6:18)
 "California Girl" (Henderson) (4:12)
 "Something I Like About That" (Henderson, Turney) (2:58)
 "17th Summer" (Ryga, Henderson, Lawrence, Miller, Turney) (9:13)
 "Rain-O" (Henderson) (7:33)
 "My Girl (Gone, Gone, Gone)" (Henderson, MacLeod) (5:31)

Musicians
Bill Henderson: lead vocals, guitars
Ed Henderson: guitar, background vocals
Doug Edwards: bass, background vocals
Jerry Adolphe: drums
Saffron & Camille Henderson: backing vocals

Chilliwack (band) albums
2003 live albums